Léon Homo (16 December 1872 – 16 August 1957) was a 20th-century French historian, a specialist of Roman history.

Biography 
After he entered the École normale supérieure in 1894, he obtained his agrégation in 1897, and defended his doctoral thesis in 1904. His principal thesis based on an analysis of the Augustan History was devoted to emperor Aurelian, and the book he published in 1904 still constitutes a reference. His secondary thesis dealt with Claudius Gothicus, the predecessor of Aurelian.

A member of the École française de Rome from 1897 to 1900, he conducted archaeological excavations in 1900 on the site of Dougga in Tunisia. From 1904 until 1940 he was a professor of ancient history at the Faculté de Lettres de Lyon. When he retired in 1940, he settled in Paris where he pursued his historical publications.

Works 
From 1928, Léon Homo published a number of popular books for an educated public addressing Roman history as a whole, and the relations between the Empire and Christianity.

In 1926, he vigorously opposed the thesis of Hermann Dessau on the uniqueness of the author of the Augustan History, defending the traditional view of six writers and their historical value. Subsequent historical research proved him wrong. 
 
1904: Essai sur le règne d’Aurélien (270-275), Paris, 1904 (doctorate thesis)
1922: Problèmes sociaux de jadis à présent, Paris, Éditions Flammarion, 
1925: L'Italie primitive et les débuts de l'impérialisme romain, Paris, 
1925: L'Empire Romain : le gouvernement du monde, la défense du monde, l'exploitation du monde, Paris, Payot
1926: Notes de lecture de Paul Graindor, Revue belge de philologie et d'histoire, vol. 5, n° 4, p. 1068-1074, 
1926: « Les documents de l'Histoire Auguste et leur valeur historique », Revue historique, 151 (2),  and 152 (1), .
1927: Les institutions politiques romaines, de la cité à l'Etat, Paris, Renaissance du livre
1930: La civilisation romaine, Paris, Payot
1931: Les empereurs romains et le christianisme, Paris, Payot
1933: Le Haut Empire, Paris, PUF, Histoire générale under the direction of Gustave Glotz
1934: Rome médiévale, 476-1420 : histoire, civilisation, vestiges, Paris, Payot
1935: Auguste, Paris, Payot 
1936: Notes de lecture de Paul Graindor, Revue belge de philologie et d'histoire, vol. 15, n° 1, pp. 177–178 
1936: Sylla, Paris, Desclée de Brouwer
1941: Nouvelle histoire romaine, Paris, Fayard
1947: Le Siècle d'or de l'Empire romain, Paris, Fayard
1949: Vespasien, l'empereur du bon sens (69-79), Paris, Albin Michel
1950: Notes de lecture de André Charles André, L'antiquité classique, Tome 19, fasc. 2, pp. 507–509 .
1950: De la Rome païenne à la Rome chrétienne
1951: Alexandre le Grand, Paris, Fayard
1951: Rome impériale et l'urbanisme dans l'Antiquité, Paris, Albin Michel (series "L'évolution de l'Humanité").
1952: Notes de lecture de Laet Sigfried, L'Antiquité classique, Tome 21, fasc. 2, pp. 547–548

References

Bibliography 
 
 
 Pierre Wuilleumier, « Léon Homo », Mélanges d'archéologie et d'histoire, T. 70, 1958. pp. 446–447 .

20th-century French historians
French scholars of Roman history
École Normale Supérieure alumni
People from Épernay
1872 births
1957 deaths